New Rice for Africa ("NERICA") is a cultivar group of interspecific hybrid rice developed by the Africa Rice Center (AfricaRice) to improve the yield of African rice cultivars. Although 240 million people in West Africa rely on rice as the primary source of food energy and protein in their diet, the majority of this rice is imported. Self-sufficiency in rice production would improve food security and aid economic development in West Africa.

The results of the NERICA Project, which is funded by the African Development Bank, the Japanese government, and the United Nations Development Programme, was a major agenda item at the Fourth Tokyo International Conference on African Development (TICAD-IV) in 2008.  The new rice varieties, which are suited to drylands, were distributed and sown on more than 200,000 hectares during the last five years in several African countries, notably Guinea, Nigeria, Mali, Benin, Côte d'Ivoire, and Uganda, according to the Africa Rice Center.  Though this represents a major advance, it is still projected to fall short of meeting the growing demand for rice as a food staple.

African and Asian rice
African rice has profuse vegetative growth, which serves to smother weeds; it is also resistant to drought, the insect pest African rice gall midge (Orseolia oryzivora), Rice yellow mottle virus and blast disease. However, African rice has relatively low yields, because it lodges, or falls over, when grain heads are full. Grains may also shatter, further reducing yield.

Cultivation of African rice has been abandoned for the cultivation of high-yield Asian varieties of Oryza sativa. Asian varieties are poorly adapted to African conditions as their cultivation requires abundant water. Asian rice cannot compete with weeds due to their semi-dwarf phenotypes and are susceptible to pests and diseases in African conditions.

New rice for Africa

The new rice for Africa was created by crossing O. glaberrima and O. sativa. Because the different species do not naturally interbreed,  a plant tissue culture technique called embryo-rescue was used to assure that crosses between the two varieties survive and grow to maturity. The new rices display heterosis, the phenomenon in which the progeny of two genetically different parents grow faster, yield more, or resist stresses better than either parent.

Key features of the new varieties include:
An increase in grain head size from 75-100 grains per head to 400 grains per head.
An increase in yield from 1 tonne per hectare to 2.5 tonnes per hectare, yield increases to 5 tonnes per hectare with fertilizer use.
Contains 2% more protein than their African or Asian parents.
They are taller than most rices, which makes harvesting easier.
They resist pests, and they tolerate drought and infertile soils better than Asian varieties.

Some NERICA lines show high growth with low uptake of water and seem to be appropriate for long periods of cultivation in drought condition.

For his leadership in developing NERICA, Monty Jones was named a co-recipient of the 2004 World Food Prize.

See also

 System of Rice Intensification

Notes

References
Dingkuhn, M., Jones, M. P., Johnson, D. E. & Sow, A. 1998. Growth and yield potential of Oryza sativa and O. glaberrima upland rice cultivars and their interspecific progenies. Field Crops Research 57: 57-69.
Moseley, W.G., J. Carney and L. Becker. 2010. “Neoliberal Policy, Rural Livelihoods and Urban Food Security in West Africa: A Comparative Study of The Gambia, Côte d'Ivoire and Mali."  Proceedings of the National Academy of Sciences of the United States of America. 107 (13) 5774-5779.

External links
Africa Rice Center (AfricaRice)
 
 
 
 
 

Rice varieties